James C. Welsh (2 June 1880 – 4 November 1954) was a miner, trade unionist, novelist and Scottish Labour Party politician who served as a Member of Parliament (MP) from 1922 to 1931, and from 1935 to 1945.
Welsh worked in mines from the age of 12, an experience which informed his first novels The Underworld (1920) and The Morlocks (1924). He later became a full-time official for the mining union. He unsuccessfully contested the 1918 general election in the Lanark constituency.  At the 1922 general election, he was elected as MP for Coatbridge constituency, where he was re-elected in 1923, 1924 and 1929, but was defeated at the 1931 general election by the Conservative Party candidate William Paterson Templeton.

From the age of 12, James C. Welsh had a job working in the mines, and stayed there for 24 years. This experience informed his first novels The Underworld (1920) and The Morlocks (1924). He later became a full-time official for the mining union. He unsuccessfully contested the 1918 general election in the Lanark constituency.  At the 1922 general election, he was elected as MP for Coatbridge constituency, where he was re-elected in 1923, 1924 and 1929, but was defeated at the 1931 general election by the Conservative Party candidate William Paterson Templeton.

He was returned to the House of Commons at the 1935 general election as MP for Bothwell, and held the seat until he stepped down at the 1945 general election.

Selected works
Songs of a Miner (1917)
The Underworld (1920)
The Morlocks (1924)
Norman Dale, M.P. (1928)

Sources

References

External links 
 
  
 

1880 births
1954 deaths
Members of the Parliament of the United Kingdom for Scottish constituencies
Miners' Federation of Great Britain-sponsored MPs
Scottish Labour MPs
UK MPs 1922–1923
UK MPs 1923–1924
UK MPs 1924–1929
UK MPs 1929–1931
UK MPs 1935–1945
Scottish novelists
Proletarian literature
20th-century Scottish novelists
Scottish male novelists
Scottish miners